The Materials Science Citation Index is a citation index, established in 1992, by Thomson ISI (Thomson Reuters). Its overall focus is cited reference searching of the notable and significant journal literature in materials science. The database makes accessible the various properties, behaviors, and materials in the materials science discipline. This then encompasses applied physics, ceramics, composite materials, metals and metallurgy, polymer engineering, semiconductors, thin films, biomaterials, dental technology, as well as optics. The database indexes relevant materials science information from over 6,000 scientific journals that are part of the ISI database which is multidisciplinary. Author abstracts are searchable, which links articles sharing one or more bibliographic references. The database also allows a researcher to use an appropriate (or related to research) article as a base to search forward in time to discover more recently published articles that cite it.

Materials Science Citation Index lists 625 high impact journals, and is accessible via the Science Citation Index Expanded collection of databases.

Editions
Coverage of Materials science is accomplished with the following editions:
Materials Science, Ceramics
Materials Science, Characterization & Testing
Materials Science, Biomaterials
Materials Science, Coatings & Films
Materials Science, Composites
Materials Science, Paper & Wood
Materials Science, Multidisciplinary
Materials Science, Textiles

See also
 Science Citation Index
 Academic publishing
 List of academic databases and search engines
 Social Sciences Citation Index, which covers over 1500 journals, beginning with 1956
 Arts and Humanities Citation Index, which covers over 1000 journals, beginning with 1975
 Impact factor
 VINITI Database RAS

References

Thomson Reuters
Bibliographic databases and indexes
Online databases
Citation indices